Kim Mi-kyung (born 5 July 1965) is a South Korean politician serving as Mayor of Eunpyeong District of Seoul from 2018 and its first woman mayor.

Kim's father unsuccessfully ran for Eunpyeong District Council member in 1998. Kim's family supported her campaign in 2003 bi-election for the same post.

In the 2007 bi-election which happened on the same day as 2007 South Korean presidential election, Kim was the only democratic local council member to be elected outside of liberal stronghold Honam region with others being members of Hannara Party, the party of president-elect Lee Myung-bak.

From 2010 to 2014 Kim worked as the spokesperson of her party in Seoul Metropolitan Council. Also, she took several roles in her party such as deputy spokesperson of her party, vice chair of its Women's Committee and vice chair of Policy Planning Committee.

In 2014 Kim was elected as the first woman to chair the City Planning Management Committee of Seoul Metropolitan Council.

Kim joined both of Moon Jae-in's presidential campaigns - chair of Seoul branch of the committee composed of members from civil societies in 2012 and chair of special committee on veterans affairs in 2017.

In the 2020 election, Kim could not even stand for the first round of primary to secure her party's nomination for Eunpyeong Mayor. However, with the petition of 8000 people signed in two days, she requested retrial to her party's election commission and eventually topped two rounds of primary elections defeating 8 potential candidates and securing the nomination.

Kim holds two degrees - a bachelor from Korea National Open University and a master's from Korea University. She also completed a doctoral programme in cultural arts studies at Chugye University for the Arts.

Electoral history

References 

1965 births
Living people
Mayors of places in South Korea
Minjoo Party of Korea politicians
21st-century South Korean women politicians
21st-century South Korean politicians
Uri Party politicians
People from South Jeolla Province
Chugye University for the Arts alumni
Korea University alumni
Korea National Open University alumni
Eunpyeong District